Abd al-Aziz ibn Nuh (died 10th-century) was amir of the Samanids briefly in 992. He was the son of Nuh I.

In 992, the Karakhanids under Bughra Khan invaded the domains of amir Nuh II, and briefly wrested Bukhara from Samanid control. However, during his stay in Bukhara, Bughra Khan fell sick, and in order to ensure that the city remained under Karakhanid control, he installed Nuh's uncle Abd al-Aziz as the Samanid ruler, effectively as a Karakhanid puppet. Bughra Khan then left Bukhara for Samarkand, but died before he reached the city. Nuh quickly used the opportunity to reconquer Bukhara, and had Abd al-Aziz blinded and imprisoned. After the event, Abd al-Aziz disappeared from sources, and probably died some years later.

References
 
 

Samanids
10th-century deaths
10th-century monarchs in the Middle East
10th-century Iranian people
10th-century births